Wicked Tuna: Outer Banks is a reality television series about commercial tuna fishermen based in the Outer Banks off the coast of North Carolina who battle each other to see who can get the most profit from catching Atlantic bluefin tuna. This is a spinoff of the reality TV show Wicked Tuna which is based on Gloucester, Massachusetts. The series has aired on National Geographic Channel since August 17, 2014. As of October 6, 2019, 67 episodes of Wicked Tuna: Outer Banks have aired in over 6 seasons.

Series overview

Episodes

Season 1 (2014)

Season 2 (2015)

Season 3 (2016)

Season 4 (2017)

Season 5 (2018)

Season 6 (2019)

Season 7 (2020)

References

External links
 Wicked Tuna: Outer Banks at the National Geographic Channel
 

Lists of American non-fiction television series episodes
Lists of reality television series episodes